Hansteen Holdings plc is a European industrial REIT that invests in properties with high yields, low financing costs and opportunity for value improvement across the Netherlands, Germany, Belgium, France and the UK. It is listed on the London Stock Exchange.

History 
The company was founded by Morgan Jones and Ian Watson in 2005 to exploit the industrial property investment market in Continental Europe. It was admitted to the Alternative Investment Market in November 2005, raising £125 million. In October 2009 it raised a further £200.8 million by way of a Placing and Open Offer and moved to the Official List, converting to a REIT shortly thereafter.

In December 2019, it was announced that funds advised by The Blackstone Group would buy the company for £500 million.

Operations 
In August 2009 Hansteen launched Hansteen UK Industrial Property Unit Trust (HPUT), a vehicle with up to £180 million to invest in UK industrial property with a value of £15 million or less, or portfolios under £30 million. In 2010 Hansteen increased its portfolio to 189 assets with a value of around £721.9 million through the acquisition of a German industrial property portfolio from HBI for approx. €330 million and the acquisition of the  multi-sector Kilmartin portfolio of UK properties for £80.37 million. The Company's investment portfolio was valued at £1.7 billion as at 31 December 2016.

References

External links 
 Official site

Companies listed on the London Stock Exchange
Real estate companies established in 2005
Property companies based in London
Real estate investment trusts of the United Kingdom